Tanaka is a unisex given name of Shona origin, meaning "we have become beautiful; good" as well as "we are in a state of beauty; goodness." Shona names are given to children regarding the circumstance of their birth, a child borne from a difficult birth may be named "Nyasha" so as to say "we have experienced grace from God" because he let both child and mother live. Shona names are as symbolic as they are spiritual, often naming children names that praise God.

The name does not have spelling variations as Shona is phonetic language and any changes can result in the alteration of the name and definition entirely. However one could still spell it as - Tanakha, Thanakha, Ttanaka, Tannaka, Tanakka - although such spelling are rarely if ever used at all.

Similar names include Takanaka, Makanaka, Manaka, Wanaka.

People with the name 

 Tanaka Chinyahara Zimbabwean professional footballer
 Tanaka Chivanga a Zimbabwean cricketer 
 Tanaka Chikati a traditional music from Zimbabwe
 Tanaka Zvaita December 28 reserve for Zimbabwe's squad for the 2022 ICC Under-19 Cricket World Cup squads
 Tanaka Chidora a Zimbabwean poet, literary critic and academic
 Tanaka Dumbura a Zimbabwean model
 Tanaka Masamuke a Zimbabwean online entrepreneur
 Tanaka Siziba Zimbabwean musical artist

References 

Shona given names
Given names
Zimbabwean names
Unisex given names